Petrobacter is a genus of gram-negative, non-spore-forming bacteria from the family of Rhodocyclaceae which belongs to the class of Betaproteobacteria. So fare there is only one species known (Petrobacter succinatimandens).

References

Bacteria genera
Monotypic bacteria genera
Rhodocyclaceae